Pareeth Mammy Meerakutty (28 February 1930 – 24 August 2017) was a Malayalam writer, literary critic, and teacher. He taught Malayalam language and literature at various levels of educational institutions in a teaching career spanning over 44 years.
Meerakutty served as General Council Member of the Kerala Sahitya Akademi during the period 2011–2014.

Life sketch
Meerakutty was born at Thankalam in Kothamangalam Municipality in Kerala state, India on 28 February 1930 to Marottickal Pareeth Mammy and Kayyamma.

Education
He did his school education from Mathirappilly Govt. Primary School, Thrikkariyoor NSS Middle School, Muvattupuzha NSS Malayalam High School and Kothamangalam Mar Basil English High School. He earned Bachelor of Arts (BA) in Malayalam Literature, Master of Arts (MA) Malayalam Literature, Malayalam Sahithya Visarad and Hindi Rashtrabhasha Visarad degrees through self study. He did his 'Bachelor in Education (BEd) study in Thalassery Govt. Training College.

Academic career
His 44 years long career as teacher started at Netaji Library Adult Education Programme at Kothamangalam. Later he worked as Malayalam Teacher in Asramam High School Perumbavoor, Mar Basil High School Kothamangalam and M.G.M High School Kuruppampady. In 1966, he joined the department of Malayalam in Thangal Kunju Musaliar College of Arts and Sciences, Kollam and worked there till 1990. Simultaneously he prepared students for Teacher Training course at Kuruppampady Vidvan Vidyalaya for 15 years. He was appointed as Professor Emeritus at Sree Sankaracharya University of Sanskrit, Kalady.

Literary works
Meerakutty's literary works falls under the categories of Literary Criticism, History of Literature, Grammar, History, biography, Children's Literature and Translation. His views on Sabarimala Ayyappan and Onam are controversial.

Committee organization
Meerakutty served as General Council Member of the Kerala Sahitya Akademi during the period 2011–2014. He was one of the founders of Kadhasamithy at Muvattupuzha. He also served as the Kollam District President of Purogamana Kala Sahitya Sangham (Progressive Arts & Literary Organisation) an Association for Art and Letters, also known as the PuKaSa, an organization of artists, writers and art and literature enthusiasts based in Kerala. He was also State committee member of All Kerala Private School Teachers Association (AKPCTA) and Association of Sixty Opted College Teachers.

Personal life
He married K.Suleikha Beevi in the year 1960. He has four children, Dr. Shiney Ali, Dr. Rejula Rabi, M.Shairaj IRS and Dr. Lajni Shafeeq.

Dementia and Death
In 2010, dementia and memory loss symptoms developed and he was identified as having Alzheimer's disease (AD) which ultimately led to his death during the early hours of 24 August 2017

Bibliography

Literary Criticism
 Asan Kavitha: Kaviyude Atmakatha
 Asan, Kerala Kalidasan
 Asan Kavitha Rodhavum Prathirodhavum
 Asan Thott Idassery Vare
 Leela (Lakhu Pdanam)
 Chandlabhikshuki (Lakhu Pdanam)
 Vilasiniyude Akhyanakala
 Vilasiniyude Novalukal: Athmakathayude Padabhedangal
 Appan Kavithayude Thirumadhuraprasadam
 Thachethu Kavithayude Pooppoli
 Manappadan Kavithalathayude Harithakalavanyapooram
 Mukhathalayude Khandakavyangal
 Idassery: Navabhavukathinte Kavi
 Basheer: Kalathinte Kanal
 Athyanthadhunika Niroopanam
 Amruthalekha
 Akalakkazhchakal
 Basheerinte Poovanpazham

History of Literature
 Isangal Sahithyathiyathil(3rd Edition published in 2019 by Haritham Books, Calicut)
 Thanathu Puthusidhanthangal
 Ankurangal
 Ithalukal
 Kalapabodhathinte Kanikal

Grammar
 Kerala Panineeyam: Chila Anubandha Chinthakal

History
 Sabarimala Sri Ayyappanum Kunjanum (2nd Edition was published in 2018 by Haritham Books, Calicut)
Sabarimala Sri Ayyappanum Mattu Padanangalum

Biography
 A. Thangal Kunju Musaliar
 Novel Pole Oru Athmakatha (Two Parts) Autobiography

Children's Literature
 Jalaluddin Rumi Kathakal
 Poomottukal

Translation
 Ramayana Champu Sundarakandam (From Sanskrit)
 Nellinte Katha (From English)

Awards and recognition
 Asan Centenary Award
 Vallathol Award
 SBT Literary Award
 Kesary Award
 Samvedanam Award
 CH Muhammed Koya Award
 Sahodaran Ayyappan Award
 Atmayanangalude Kasak Award

Legacy
There are three literary awards instituted in memory of Meerakutty.

The Malayalam monthly Bhoomikkaran instituted an award in the memory of Meerakutty. The first award was presented to Sri.K.Sukumaran for his Malayalam novel Mahanadikkarayil in 2018 February. The award for 2019 was presented to Sri. Ramachandran Karavaram for his novel Aparaswathwam Nirakaram.

The poetry award by Suvarnarekha, an art and literary organisation based at Kothamangalam is named after Meerakutty. The first year award was presented to Smt. Brinda, for her collection of poems, ‘Avan Poombattakalude Thottathilekku Chiraku Vidarthunnu" published by DC Books

The Prof. P. Meerakutty Foundation, Thrikkakkara, Kochi has instituted an yearly award worth Rs 25,000. The first award was presented to Sri. Iyyamcode Sreedharan, a writer and former Secretary of Kerala Kalamandalam for his biographical book Swapnadanam dedicated to poet P. Kunhiraman Nair.

References

External links
 http://shodhganga.inflibnet.ac.in/bitstream/10603/97562/11/11_bibilography.pdf
reference
 http://www.keralasahityaakademi.org/pdf/22-04-17/ANUSOCHANAM-26.08.2017.pdf
 http://shodhganga.inflibnet.ac.in/bitstream/10603/149408/15/15_bibliography.pdf
 http://shodhganga.inflibnet.ac.in/bitstream/10603/24289/13/13_bibliography.pdf.pdf
 http://shodhganga.inflibnet.ac.in/bitstream/10603/7619/10/10_chapter%206.pdf
 http://shodhganga.inflibnet.ac.in/bitstream/10603/25997/15/15_bibliography.pdf
 http://shodhganga.inflibnet.ac.in/bitstream/10603/27103/13/13_chapter%207.pdf
 https://marthomacollegechungathara.org/

1930 births
2017 deaths
Malayalam-language writers
People from Ernakulam district
Indian critics
20th-century Indian non-fiction writers